Simone Davì (born 16 September 1999) is an Italian football player. He plays for  club Südtirol.

Club career
Davì was raised in the youth teams of Südtirol. He began his senior career in the 2017–18 season, on loan to Eccellenza club Virtus Bolzano, which was promoted to Serie D.

For the 2022–23 season, Südtirol was promoted to Serie B. He made his Serie B debut for Südtirol on 21 August 2022 in a game against Venezia.

References

External links
 

1999 births
Sportspeople from Bolzano
Living people
Italian footballers
Association football defenders
F.C. Südtirol players
Eccellenza players
Serie D players
Serie C players
Serie B players